Shannon Leigh Boxx Spearman (born June 29, 1977) is an American retired soccer player and former member of the United States women's national soccer team, playing the defensive midfielder position. She last played club soccer for the Chicago Red Stars in the American National Women's Soccer League. She won gold medals with the United States at the 2004 Athens Olympics, 2008 Beijing Olympics, and 2012 London Olympics. She has also finished third place or better with the US at the 2003, 2007, 2011 and 2015 FIFA Women's World Cups. She was a finalist for the 2005 FIFA World Player of the Year award, and won an NCAA Women's Soccer Championship with Notre Dame in 1995. Shannon Boxx announced her retirement from international and club soccer after winning the 2015 FIFA Women's World Cup. She played her last game on October 21, 2015, when the USWNT tied with Brazil as part of their victory tour.

Boxx is the younger sister of Gillian Boxx, who won a gold medal at the 1996 Olympics with the United States softball team.

Boxx was diagnosed with lupus in 2007 when she was 30 years old, and went public with her diagnosis shortly before the 2012 London Olympics at which she won gold with the United States team.

Early life
The multiracial Boxx, whose biological father, was black, was raised by her white single mother in Southern California. In a 2008 interview, she remembered that she had little contact with her African American heritage until she went to Notre Dame:

Youth Club
From U/12-U/18, Boxx played for the Torrance United Waves Soccer Club, Torrance, California, and helped to lead them to 4 State Cup Championships and two trips to the USYSA National Championship Final Four in 1993 and 1994 at U/17 and U/19.

High school
From 1991 to 1995, Boxx attended South Torrance High School, where she was a four-sport athlete, playing soccer, volleyball, softball and basketball. She was named to the Parade All-America team for girls' soccer in 1995.

College
Boxx played for the Notre Dame Fighting Irish from 1995 to 1998. She helped the team win the school's first NCAA Women's Soccer Championship in 1995, beating defending champions North Carolina in the semifinal. Boxx was named to the All-Big East team in 1995, 1996 and 1997, and is tied for the most soccer games played for the Irish at 101 games.

College statistics

Professional career

1999–2000
In 1999, Boxx played for the Boston Renegades of the W-League, and then went to Germany to play for 1. FC Saarbrücken in the women's Bundesliga. However, she was unhappy and considered retiring from soccer.

WUSA
In 2001, Women's United Soccer Association began play, and Boxx was drafted by the San Diego Spirit in the third round of the entry draft, with the 19th pick overall.

In the 2001 season, Boxx started all 21 matches for the Spirit, missing 20 minutes of the entire season, and was named to the All-WUSA team. However, her playing time was reduced the following season, and in September 2002, she was sent to the New York Power, in a six-player trade that gave San Diego the first overall pick in the 2003 draft, used to select Aly Wagner.

With New York, Boxx returned to form, starting all 21 games, scoring once and assisting a career-high eight times, and was named to the 2003 All-WUSA squad. Former women's national team coach and league commissioner Tony DiCicco called Boxx "the best in our league at (defensive midfield) – physical, strong, technical".

WPS

In 2009, Boxx signed to the Los Angeles Sol for the inaugural season of Women's Professional Soccer and was named team captain. She started in 18 of the 19 matches she played for the Sol, scoring three goals with three assists. Boxx was named to the WPS First Team and played in the WPS All-Star Game. The Sol finished in first place during the regular season with a 12–3–5 record.

In 2010, she was signed to the Saint Louis Athletica during the Los Angeles Sol dispersal draft.

Later in the season after Saint Louis Athletica folded, she was traded to the FC Gold Pride. Boxx helped the team win the WPS regular season title and championship.  She started in 19 of the 20 games she played in, while scoring one goal and providing five assists. She was a WPS All-Star Game starter and received the fifth overall votes.

For the 2011 WPS season, Boxx signed with magicJack and played 833 minutes in 10 games starting in them all.  She helped the club make a run to the playoffs in the second half of the season and win the quarterfinal match against the Boston Breakers.

NWSL
In 2013, she joined Chicago Red Stars in the new National Women's Soccer League. Due to injury Boxx played 2 matches in 2013, played in 5 matches in 2014 due to pregnancy and birth of her first child, and in 2015 played 4 times due World Cup duties. On July 27, 2015, Boxx announced retirement from NWSL and Red Stars effective immediately.

International career

Although Boxx was a member of the United States Under-21 national team pool, she did not receive her first senior cap until August 2003, when U.S. national team coach April Heinrichs named her to the team's 2003 FIFA Women's World Cup squad, making her the first uncapped player to be named to a U.S. Women's World Cup squad. Prior to the call-up, following the suspension of WUSA, Boxx had planned to take a coaching position at Cal State-Dominguez Hills and pursue a graduate degree at Pepperdine University.

Boxx scored a goal in each of the two pre-World Cup friendlies, against Costa Rica and Mexico, and in the opening match of the World Cup against Sweden, Boxx became the first American woman to score three goals in her first three matches with the national team.

Boxx started five matches at the Women's World Cup, scoring again against Canada in the third place match. She was voted the player of the match against Canada by the FIFA Technical Study Group, who said Boxx "seized control of the game, spurred on her team-mates and finally scored the decisive goal in USA's victory".

Boxx started 31 of 32 national team matches she played in 2004, including all six matches at the 2004 Olympics, where she scored a goal, assisted on another and helped the team win a gold medal. She scored eight goals over the course of the year, including a hat trick against Trinidad and Tobago in an Olympic qualifying match. Boxx came in seventh in the voting for the 2004 FIFA World Player of the Year award.

In 2005, Boxx started all nine matches US national team matches, playing all but 23 minutes of all matches played. She was a finalist for the 2005 FIFA World Player of the Year, coming in third behind Birgit Prinz and Marta.

Boxx missed most of 2006, first for surgery to repair torn cartilage in her right hip, and then for torn medial collateral ligaments she suffered on her first day back in training with the national team. She returned in 2007 after an eight-month layoff, and was named to the United States' squad for the 2007 FIFA Women's World Cup. Boxx helped the team reach the semifinal match against Brazil, but she was sent off after receiving two yellow cards, and the United States went on to lose 4–0.
Boxx played every minute of all five U.S. games in the 2008 Summer Olympics in Beijing.

In 2011, she played in all but one of the World Cup games, earning defensive team honors for her efforts throughout the tournament.  During the World Cup final against Japan, which went to overtime penalty shoot-out, Boxx was one of the Americans elected to take one of the penalty kicks, and had her shot saved by Japan's goalkeeper Ayumi Kaihori.

(*Correct )

International goals

In popular culture

Video games
Boxx was featured along with her national teammates in the EA Sports' FIFA video game series in FIFA 16, the first time women players were included in the game.

Ticker-tape parade and White House honor
Following the United States' win at the 2015 FIFA Women's World Cup, Boxx and her teammates became the first women's sports team to be honored with a ticker-tape parade in New York City. Each player received a key to the city from Mayor Bill de Blasio. In October of the same year, the team was honored by President Barack Obama at the White House.

See also

 List of footballers with 100 or more caps
 List of Olympic medalists in football
 List of multiple Olympic gold medalists in one event
 List of multiple Olympic gold medalists
 List of 2004 Summer Olympics medal winners
 List of 2008 Summer Olympics medal winners
 All-time Los Angeles Sol roster
 All-time Saint Louis Athletica roster

References

Match reports

External links

 
 
 US Soccer player profile
 Notre Dame player profile
 Los Angeles Sol player profile
 Chicago Red Stars player profile 

1977 births
Living people
United States women's international soccer players
People from Fontana, California
Olympic gold medalists for the United States in soccer
Parade High School All-Americans (girls' soccer)
American Youth Soccer Organization players
Footballers at the 2004 Summer Olympics
Footballers at the 2008 Summer Olympics
Footballers at the 2012 Summer Olympics
1. FC Saarbrücken (women) players
Frauen-Bundesliga players
Notre Dame Fighting Irish women's soccer players
San Diego Spirit players
Sportspeople from San Bernardino County, California
Los Angeles Sol players
Saint Louis Athletica players
FC Gold Pride players
MagicJack (WPS) players
African-American women's soccer players
American women's soccer players
FIFA Century Club
2003 FIFA Women's World Cup players
2007 FIFA Women's World Cup players
2011 FIFA Women's World Cup players
2015 FIFA Women's World Cup players
National Women's Soccer League players
Chicago Red Stars players
Medalists at the 2012 Summer Olympics
Medalists at the 2008 Summer Olympics
Medalists at the 2004 Summer Olympics
New York Power players
FIFA Women's World Cup-winning players
Women's association football midfielders
American expatriate soccer players in Germany
Expatriate women's soccer players in Australia
People with lupus
21st-century African-American sportspeople
21st-century African-American women
American expatriate women's soccer players
20th-century African-American sportspeople
20th-century African-American women
20th-century African-American people
Women's Professional Soccer players
National Soccer Hall of Fame members
USL W-League (1995–2015) players
Boston Renegades players
Women's United Soccer Association players